I Do is a 1921 American short comedy film featuring Harold Lloyd. This short is notable for having a cartoon wedding in the first scene.

Plot

The Boy meets and marries The Girl. A year later, the two walk down the street with a baby carriage carrying a bottle instead of a baby when they run into The Girl's brother who asks the couple to do him a favor and babysit his children. They accept and the remainder of the short consists of gags showcasing the difficulties of babysitting children. At the very end, The Boy discovers some knitted baby clothes in a drawer (implying that The Girl is pregnant).

Cast
 Harold Lloyd as The Boy
 Mildred Davis as The Girl 
 Noah Young as The Agitation
 Jackie Morgan as The Disturbance
 Jackie Edwards as The Annoyance
 Irene De Voss

See also
 Harold Lloyd filmography
 Silent film

References

External links

1921 films
American silent short films
1921 comedy films
American black-and-white films
Films directed by Hal Roach
1921 short films
Surviving American silent films
Films about marriage
American comedy short films
Short films with live action and animation
1920s American films
Silent American comedy films